The Museum of the American Revolution (formerly The American Revolution Center) is a museum in Philadelphia, Pennsylvania dedicated to telling the story of the American Revolution. The museum was opened to the public on April 19, 2017, the 242nd anniversary of the first battles of the war, at Lexington and Concord, on April 19, 1775.

Overview 
The museum owns a collection of several thousand objects including artwork and sculpture, textiles and weapons, manuscripts and rare books. Permanent and special exhibition galleries, theaters and large-scale tableaux portray the individuals and events and engage people in the history and continuing relevance of the American Revolution.

Morris W. Offit serves as the chairman of the Board of the Directors. Dr. R. Scott Stephenson was named president and CEO in November 2018.  Philadelphia area media entrepreneur and philanthropist H. F. "Gerry" Lenfest served as chairman of the board of directors from 2005 until 2016 and was instrumental in leading the Museum to its opening in 2017.

Location 
The museum is located in the historic heart of Philadelphia, the city that served as the headquarters of America's founding. The site is across the street from the First Bank of the United States and two blocks from Independence Hall, the National Constitution Center, Second Bank of the United States, American Philosophical Society, Carpenters' Hall, and the Liberty Bell.

Design and construction 
The building was designed by Robert A.M. Stern Architects (RAMSA), and on June 12, 2012, RAMSA partner and Driehaus Prize winner Robert A. M. Stern unveiled designs for the permanent location. Groundbreaking for the museum occurred in fall 2014.

The museum rises three stories above the street and, with a full basement, encompasses 118,000 total square feet, with 32,000 dedicated to exhibits and interpretive spaces. The first floor includes a museum shop and the Cross Keys Café which opens to the sidewalk. The first floor interior is organized around a skylit central interior court and features a cross-vaulted ticketing lobby, a multi-use theater and a changing exhibition gallery.  The second floor features 18,000 square feet of galleries and a theater dedicated to the exhibition of George Washington's marquee tent.  The museum's third floor offers rooms for events and two terraces overlooking the First Bank of the United States, Independence National Historical Park, and the Philadelphia skyline beyond. The museum is seeking Leadership in Energy and Environmental Design (LEED) Silver certification.

The museum opened on 19 April 2017.

Outdoor plaza
The Museum's outdoor plaza opened on 25 September 2016.  It is accessible to both museum visitors and to passersby, and feature dramatic installations of Revolutionary War artifacts, bronze sculpture, shaded seating, and – once the museum building opens, seasonal café seating.

Exhibits 
Visitors follow a chronological journey from the roots of conflict in the 1760s to the rise of armed resistance, the Declaration of independence of 1776 through the final years of the war. Visitors see the diversity of revolutionary-era Americans and their opinions, for example by viewing an Oneida Indian council house, and the 1773 volume Poems on Various Subjects by Phillis Wheatley, America's first published black female poet.

Several immersive gallery experiences feature a full-scale replica of Boston's Liberty Tree, the recreation of an Oneida Indian Council, the Battlefield Theater featuring the Battle of Brandywine, a recreation of Independence Hall, and a large model of an 18th-century privateer ship. A dedicated theater houses an iconic surviving artifact of the Revolution: General Washington's Headquarters Tent, which served as both his office and sleeping quarters throughout much of the war.

The Museum's president and CEO, formerly the Vice President of Collections, Exhibitions, and Programming, Dr. R. Scott Stephenson holds an M.A. and Ph.D. in American History from the University of Virginia. Stephenson is a specialist in colonial and revolutionary American history and material culture with a background in visual storytelling. Dr. Philip C. Mead, Chief Historian and Director of Curatorial Affairs, holds an M.A. and PhD in American History from Harvard University.

Other historians who have been consulted on the project include: Richard Beeman (University of Pennsylvania), Vincent Brown (Harvard University), Thomas Chavez (National Hispanic Cultural Center), Thomas J. Fleming (writer and novelist), James Hattendorf (US Naval War College), Don Higginbotham (University of North Carolina), Pauline Maier (Massachusetts Institute of Technology), Holly Mayer (Duquesne University), Thomas McGuire (Malvern Preparatory School), David McCullough (Yale University), Gary Nash (University of California, LA), Ray Raphael (University of California, Berkeley), Matthew Spooner (Columbia University), Laurel Thatcher Ulrich (Harvard University), and Gordon S. Wood (Brown University).

Collection 

The Museum of the American Revolution has a collection of several thousand objects. The museum's collection includes items owned and used by General George Washington during the War of Independence, an extensive collection of historic firearms and edged weapons, important art, important manuscripts, and rare books.  The collection started by Rev. W. Herbert Burk in the early 1900s makes up the core of the collection.

Some items have been displayed at George Washington's Mount Vernon, Valley Forge National Historical Park, the National Constitution Center, the Winterthur Museum, the Senator John Heinz History Center and the North Carolina Museum of History.

Highlights include:

 George Washington's tent
 Silver camp cups from Washington's field equipment 
 Wartime correspondence and books from Washington's library
 The thirteen-star flag known as the Commander-in-Chief's Standard  
 The fowling piece carried by Captain David Brown, leader of a company of minutemen from Concord, Massachusetts, and a British military musket carried by a soldier of the 4th (King's Own) Regiment of Foot, both of whom participated in the first battle of the War of Independence, April 19, 1775.  
 A Dreadful Scene of Havock, Xavier della Gatta's painting of the Battle of Paoli 
 The Battle of Germantown, by Xavier della Gatta (1782)
 William B. T. Trego’s iconic 1883 painting The March to Valley Forge. 
 Soldiers’ letters and orderly books as well as volumes owned by Patrick Henry, George Mason and other founders
 Volume of ancient Roman history by the author and historian Livy, owned by George Mason
 A copy of the first newspaper printing of the Declaration of Independence, printed by the Pennsylvania Evening Post on July 6, 1776
 British plan of the Battle of Brandywine
 Hessian headgear

Selections from the collection

Awards 
In 2012, the museum received the MUSE Award (Silver level) from the American Alliance of Museums in the category of Mobile Applications, recognizing the museum's American Revolution Interactive Timeline iPad app.

In 2017, the museum received the Pennsylvania Historic Preservation Award in the category of Preservation Planning for Washington's War Tent.

In 2017, the museum was nominated for a Leading Cultural Destinations Award 2017 – “The Museum Oscars” – for Best New Cultural Destination of the Year, North America.

In 2017, the museum's digital interactives by Bluecadet won a Communication Arts 2017 Design Annual Awards.

In 2017, the museum won an Award of Merit from the British Guild of Travel Writers.

In 2017, the museum was named Engineering News-Record’s Best Projects 2017 Award of Merit in the Cultural/Worship Category.

In 2017, the museum was named ACE 2017 URBAN PROJECT OF THE YEAR.

In 2018, the museum received an Excellence in Exhibition Award for Special Achievement for engaging audiences in something they think they know in new ways from the American Alliance of Museums (AAM).

In 2018, the museum received PA Museums' Institutional Award for Washington's War Tent.

In 2018, the museum was awarded an AASLH Award of Merit.

In 2018, the Institute of Classical Architecture recognized the Museum of the American Revolution with its Stanford White Award in the category of commercial, civic, and institutional architecture.

References

External links 
 

Historical societies of the United States
History museums in Pennsylvania
Museums in Philadelphia
Museums established in 2017
Military and war museums in Pennsylvania
American Revolutionary War museums in Pennsylvania
Robert A. M. Stern buildings
Museums established in 2000
2000 establishments in Pennsylvania
Cultural infrastructure completed in 2017
New Classical architecture